Shake, Rattle and Roll: An American Love Story is a TV miniseries that aired on CBS on November 7 and November 10, 1999.

Plot
In the 1950s, Lyne Danner, whose father was in the military, goes to high school in Missouri with Tyler Hart. They both enjoy rock and roll and, together with Mookie and Dotson, form a band called The HartAches. The conservative parents are upset by this. Although Tyler already has a girlfriend, he and Lyne are attracted to each other. The band travels to Memphis and eventually gets a recording contract and prepare to go on tour. Record executives Moses and Elaine Gunn want Lyne out of the band, and insist that Tyler record songs by established artists. The band objects to making money that African-Americans deserve, but Tyler goes off on his own.  Tyler succeeds in his career but loses his friends, while Lyne's career as a record producer takes off years later. Lyne's friend Marsha performs in The Emeralds, a Supremes-style girl group and becomes a freedom marcher in Alabama.

Production
Scenes representing New York City were filmed on South Tryon Street in Charlotte, North Carolina. Ovens Auditorium in Charlotte represented Atlanta. Scenes representing the shooting and death of Marsha were filmed on Main Street in Mooresville, North Carolina, and Charlotte's Dunhill Hotel was used for Philadelphia.

Producer Spencer Proffer wrote the song "Baby, Here I Am", performed by The HartAches. Bob Dylan, Carole King, Graham Nash, Lamont Dozier, and Leiber and Stoller also wrote 50s-style music for the miniseries. Dylan's song is performed by B.B. King. The Emeralds sing "Wall Around My Heat," which is performed by Chanté Moore, who also appears as one of The Emeralds while Samaria Graham lipsyncs her lead vocals as Marsha.

Cast
 Bonnie Somerville – Lyne Danner
 Brad Hawkins – Tyler Hart
 Kathy Baker – Janice Danner
 Frank Whaley – Allen Kogan
 Gerald McRaney – Howard Danner
 Samaria Graham – Marsha Stokes
 Travis Fine – Mookie Gilliland
 Kai Lennox – Dotson
 Erik King – Paul Terranova
 Maggie Gyllenhaal – Noreen Bixler (Part 1)
 Leo Burmester – Corby Judd (Part 1)
 Billy Porter – Little Richard
 Brett Rice – Joe Hart (Part 1)
 Troy Donahue – Rob Kamen
 Edd Byrnes – Bobby Icovella
 Mark Christopher Lawrence – Fats Domino
 Terence Trent D'Arby – Jackie Wilson
 James Coburn – Moses Gunn
 Dana Delany – Elaine Gunn

Rahsaan Patterson, singer Jesse Powell, and R&B artists K-Ci & JoJo also appear as an unnamed singing quartet. Blink-182's Tom DeLonge and Mark Hoppus play surf-rockers Jan and Dean.

References

External links

CBS original programming